Evliya Çelebi: The Fountain of Youth (Tr: Evliya Çelebi ve Ölümsüzlük Suyu) is a Turkish animated adventure-comedy film directed by Serkan Zelzele. The film went on nationwide general release on November 14, 2014.

References

External links
 The official trailer on YouTube
 The official teaser on YouTube

Turkish animated films
2014 films